Edmund Audley (died 1524) was Bishop of Rochester, Bishop of Hereford and Bishop of Salisbury.

Life

Audley graduated BA in 1463 at University College, Oxford. He was appointed to the seventh stall in St George's Chapel, Windsor Castle in 1474 and held this until 1480.

Audley was collated as Archdeacon of the East Riding on 14 December 1475 and then as Archdeacon of Essex on 22 December 1479, serving until he was nominated to become Bishop of Rochester on 7 July 1480, and consecrated on 1 October 1480. He was then translated to be Bishop of Hereford on 22 June 1492. He was then translated to become Bishop of Salisbury on 10 January 1502. He died on 23 August 1524.

Audley was the son of Eleanor Holand. He is buried in a chapel of Salisbury Cathedral.

Notes

Citations

References
 Bishops of Salisbury accessed on 31 August 2007
 Britain Express: Salisbury Cathedral accessed on 31 August 2007
 
 Touchet Family accessed on 31 August 2007 (pay to access)
 Tudor Place: Edmund Touchet accessed on 31 August 2007

External links
The Audley Psalter

Year of birth unknown
1524 deaths
Bishops of Rochester
Bishops of Hereford
Bishops of Salisbury
Canons of Windsor
15th-century English Roman Catholic bishops
16th-century English Roman Catholic bishops
Archdeacons of Essex
Archdeacons of the East Riding
Alumni of University College, Oxford
15th-century births
Younger sons of barons
Chancellors of the Order of the Garter